William Vans Murray (February 9, 1760 – December 11, 1803) was an American lawyer, politician, and statesman. He served in the Maryland House of Delegates from 1788 to 1790, and in the United States House of Representatives from 1791 to 1797. He was the United States Ambassador to the Netherlands from 1797 to 1801.

Biography

Early life
William Vans Murray was born on February 9, 1760, in Glasgow in Cambridge in the Province of Maryland. He studied the Law in England.

Career
He served in the Maryland House of Delegates from 1788 to 1790. He was then elected to the US House of Representatives from the fifth district of Maryland, serving from 1791 until 1793. He represented the eighth district from 1793 to 1797. He was appointed the U.S. Minister (ambassador) to the Netherlands from 1797 until 1801. He supported the U.S. mission to France in peace negotiations.

He wrote a series of six essays, which were published in Philadelphia during the Constitutional Convention. Murray rejected the notion, advanced by Montesquieu among others, that virtue was the root of democracy. He addressed his essays to John Adams, then assigned to London as the United States ambassador, and of whom Murray was a "political disciple."

In 1799, Murray was nominated as a US minister to France.  He played a major role in securing peace and the end of the Quasi-War with the Convention of 1800.

References

Further reading
 Hill, Peter P. William Vans Murray, Federalist diplomat: the shaping of peace with France, 1797-1801 (1971)

External links

Shoreman Averted War With France - Delmarva Heritage Series

1760 births
1803 deaths
Members of the Maryland House of Delegates
Ambassadors of the United States to the Netherlands
People from Cambridge, Maryland
18th-century American diplomats
19th-century American diplomats
Federalist Party members of the United States House of Representatives from Maryland
18th-century American politicians